Lev Rvalov (23 February 1941 – 19 June 2003) was a Soviet sailor. He competed in the Flying Dutchman event at the 1968 Summer Olympics.

References

External links
 

1941 births
2003 deaths
Soviet male sailors (sport)
Olympic sailors of the Soviet Union
Sailors at the 1968 Summer Olympics – Flying Dutchman
People from Kimry